Nova & Jory were a reggaeton duo. Nova was born in Ponce, Puerto Rico and Jory was born in Carolina, Puerto Rico. They started their career in 2003 and were signed to Loud Music at the time of their split. Their debut and only album Mucha Calidad, which after a couple setbacks and push dates, was officially released on July 12, 2011. In October 2012 they announced they had split amicably. Both artists are now pursuing independent solo careers.

Early years and debut
Nova born in Ponce, Puerto Rico,  and raised in a humble environment by a single mother in Ponce metropolitan area, Santa Isabel and Peñuelas, Puerto Rico. Fernando Sierra, better known as "Jory" was born on July 5, 1986 in Carolina, Puerto Rico, and raised in the Residencial Torres de Sabana. Both performers had always shown great interest in the Latin urban genre of Reggaeton, and both had childhood dreams of being professional singers of this musical style. At a young age, and through different circumstances, they moved to the United States.  Jory was 10 when he moved to the U.S., while Nova moved at age 15 and got married at 16 with a girl whose name is unknown. Jory was raised in Camden, New Jersey. Jory is also known to be cousins with Zion from the duo Zion & Lennox.

Career
They both participated many events, talent shows, and televised competitions separately.  In 2003, they met and agreed to do a song together.  After meeting with successful results with that first song, they formed a permanent duo and create their first mixtape titled Por Encima. As a duo, they also assisted other prominent artists of the genre, including Ñejo & Dalmata, Wisin & Yandel, Zion & Lennox, and Jowell & Randy, with their own artistic endeavors.

Since 2007 they have been assisted by BadLandz Entertainment in bringing their talent to the masses, including marketing their talent in Puerto Rico.  Due in part to their label, they decide to make the move back to Puerto Rico to solidify what they had already been working on and emerge on the scene as new exponents of the genre. In Puerto Rico they collaborated with Guelo Star on a track titled "Es la Impresion", serving as producers Yai y Toly "Los Nativos". Due mostly to "Es la impresion", the duo become a big hit.  They befriended Syko "El Terror" (Syko The terror) and develop what is now their permanent studio and collaborator of their tracks, "Empresario Studio". They work with their new producer, "Onyx", bringing their careers to new levels. 

The duo collaborated with Syko and Cosculluela in the development of "Bienvenidos a Mi Mundo", a crude street song expressing the hardships of poverty and violence.  The track helped expose them as a solid, exponentially rising duo in the genre and achieved much recognition. The song was followed with a remix (feat. Zion, Franco "el Gorila", Ñejo, Polaco and others). Subsequently, they worked with Yaga & Mackie on "Perfume". The duo continue to be well received.

In 2008 they broke with BandLandz, signing up with Black Jack Music and releasing their second mixtape, "Salimos del Bloque", with support from Alex Corolla, AK 47, and Real Talk Reggaeton. 

Off the mixtape, one of the tracks produced by "Live Music" called "Traila" caught much attention and airplay, but it was not until "Bien Loco" that they took the genre by storm, receiving tremendous attention throughout Central and South America, specially in Venezuela, Colombia, Panama, and Chile for which prompted a tour in said countries, and having it be one of the top songs of 2009.  Following that success, they released other exiting singles such as "Matador" and followed up remix alongside Ñengo Flow, "No Seas Mala" (feat. Trebol Clan), and earned their participation in the mega remix "Rastrillea 2" (feat. a large number of the most prominent members of the genre). Most recently they have signed on to Millones Records, and they keep pushing boundaries coupling with great producers as Walde 'The Big Maker', 'Sinfónico', 'Jan Paul', 'Omi Colchea', 'Yampi', 'Dj Nelson', 'Montana The Producer', 'Onyx', 'Ruff' y 'Iván Lee').

In late 2011, they announced that their contract had ended with Millones Records and then publicly stated through their social media that they would be joining Loud Music in early 2012. As they continue to tour around South America to promote their debut album, they keep collaborating on remixes alongside other prominent new generation artists as J. Alvarez and Farruko and also being produced heavily by "Los de la Nazza" Musicologo & Menes in-house producers of Daddy Yankee's El Cartel Records. They were also in the works of creating a follow-up album titled Mucha Calidad Reloaded scheduled for release in 2012.

Solo careers
Both Nova and Jory have carried on very successful careers as solo artists starting 2013.

Jory Boy

Fernando Luis Sierra Benitez known as Jory Boy or just Jory was born on 4 July 1986 in Carolina, Puerto Rico. He migrated to the United States with his family at age 10 settling in Philadelphia, Pennsylvania with his 3 brothers. At age 14, his father was killed in Puerto Rico and at that moment was born the first song he wrote. At age 18, he became part of the "Yvan y Jory" and recorded his first release the group Sug Music. Soon Sug Music split going to different paths. Immediately after he formed a duo with Nova as Nova & Jory that lasted for 10 years before the duo split amicably.

In the first year of his solo career starting 2013, Jory Boy was part of the production "The Formula" within Pina Records, where he composed the song "More" that launched him internationally as a soloist. The release was by Zion and Ken feat. Jory (La Formula). Jory's solo hits "Romeo y Julieta" and "Noches de Fantasía" followed in 2013 and 2014. In 2015, he was signed to with the new company "Young Boss Entertainment Inc" and the label "La Isla del Entretenimiento Inc." working on his debut solo album the artist is working hard to launch his first much anticipated solo album Matando la Liga Two promotional pre-releases were launched singles, "Quédate Conmigo" and "Por Qué Cambiar"  become international hits. As part of promotion to launch the album, he embarked on a tour in the United States, Europe and Latin America. Jory released his solo debut album Matando la Liga in 2015, which has been followed by the Otra Liga EP series.

In mid-2018, Jory Boy was denied entry into Chile, where he was scheduled to perform a concert, because of pending legal problems back home.

Nova

Fernando L. González known as Nova and as Nova La Amenaza (Nova the Menace) was born in Santa Isabel, Puerto Rico. His reggaeton songs include "Aprovecha", "Besame", "Bien Loco", "Tú Eres De Esas", "Cazador", "Tengo Una Idea", "Adivina Que", "Boom Boom", "Esto Aquí No Para" etc. He was part of the Nova & Jory duo for 10 years. He released his solo debut album El Subestimado in 2015. He signed with the management company Compi Records Inc.

Discography: Nova & Jory

Albums

Mixtapes

Singles and collaborations

 Saco El Anormal (2007)
 Me Tienes Maquiniando (2007)
 Tu (2007)
 El Pantalon (2007)
 Dejate Llevar (2007)
 Parece Que Fue Ayer (2007)
 La Primera Noche (2007)
 Bounce (2007)
 Encima De Ti (2007)
 Como Lo Menea (2007)
 Por Encima (2007)
 Bienvenidos A Mi Mundo (feat. Cosculluela, Syko) (2008)
 Bien Loco (2008)
 Perfume (feat. Yaga y Mackie, Syko)  (2008)
 Bla Bla Bla (2009)
 Rastrillea (feat. Guelo Star, Arcángel, Voltio, Alexis & Fido, Ñengo Flow, Baby Rasta & Gringo, Yaga & Mackie, Ivy Queen, Syko, Tony Lenta, Gastam, Chyno Nyno, Ñejo & Dalmata, Trebol Clan, Nova & Jory, Franco "El Gorilla", OG Black & Guayo Man, Plan B, Zion & Lennox, De La Ghetto) (2009)
 El Mal Me Persigue (feat. Ñengo Flow, Randy Glock) (2009)
 Traila (2009)
 La Falda (feat. Mega Sexx) (2009)
 Pa Ta Bajo Contigo (feat. Godiel y Naldy) (2009)
 Somos Dos (2009)
 Juegos Nada Mas (Gerry Capo feat. Jory) (2009)
 Te Quiero Sin Ropa (Ñengo Flow feat. Jory) (2009)
 No Hay Ley (Ñengo Flow feat. Jory, John Jay, Chyno Nyno, Delirious) (2009)
 Matador (Ñengo Flow feat. Jory) (2009)
 Matador (Remix) (Ñengo Flow feat. Nova & Jory, Alexis & Fido, Jowell & Voltio) (2009)
 Tiempo Y Hora (2009)
 No Seas Mala (Trebol Clan feat. Nova & Jory) (2009)
 Alejate De Mi (Jory) (2009)
 Con Mucho Fronte (feat. Syko) (2009)
 Juquea (Nova & Jory feat. Yelsid, Shako, Mary Oquendo y Sheeno) (2009)
 Tu Cuerpo (Ryan feat. Jory) (2009)
 Terapia (Nova & Jory feat. Mega y Kenai) (2009)
 La Vida Es Corta (Yomo feat. Jory, Randy Glock) (2010)
 La Noche Perfecta (2010)
 Un Poco Mas (2010)
 Maniatico (2010)
 Dartelo Hoy (Jory feat. Amareto) (2010)
 Musica En High (Nova & Jory feat. Berto "El Original") (2010)
 Nuestro Ultimo Palo (Jory feat. Ñengo Flow) (2010)
 No Hay Nadie Como Ella (Eloy feat. Jory) (2010)
 Aunque No Lo Digas (Great Galdy feat. Jory) (2010)
 Ya Se Lo Que Tu Buscas (Polaco feat. Jory) (2010)
 Adivina Que (feat. Yomo) (2010)
 Mi Combo Jala (Pacho y Cirilo feat. Jory) (2010)
 Mi Combo Jala (Remix) (Pacho y Cirilo feat. Jory, Kendo Kaponi, Jomar, Voltio) (2010)
 Mucha Calidad (feat. Pacho y Cirilo, Ñengo Flow, Wibal y Alex, Franco "El Gorila", Chyno Nyno, Delirious) (2010)
 Besame (2010)
 Sexo (2010)
 Soy Yo (Marvin feat. Jory) (2010)
 Por El Celu (Nos "El 5 Estrellas" feat. Jory) (2010)
 Pata Boom (Daddy Yankee feat. Jory) (2010)
 Ojitos Achinao (Nova) (2010)
 No Pide Novio (Gavilan feat. Jory) (2010)
 Las 3Js (Jory feat. J Alvarez, Juno "The Hitmaker") (2010)
 No Se Que Hacer (JJ La Promesa feat. Nova) (2010)
 El Bonitillo (2011)
 Ojitos Achinao (Remix) (Nova feat. Ñengo Flow, Guelo Star, Voltio, Jay-D Y Magix) (2011)
 Tu Eres Otra Cosa (Jory feat. Ñengo Flow) (2011)
 Boom Boom (Remix) (feat. Magnate y Valentino, J Alvarez) (2011)
 Hola Beba (Remix) (Jory feat. Farruko, J Alvarez) (2011)
 Todas Las Solteras (Jory feat. Gocho, Ñengo Flow) (2011)
 Besame (Remix) (feat. Rakim & Ken-Y) (2011)
 Yo Se Que Quieres (feat. Alexis & Fido) (2011)
 Hoy (Remix) (Jory feat. Farruko, Daddy Yankee, J Alvarez) (2011)
 Que Quieres De Mi (Remix) (feat. Gotay "El Autentiko", Ñengo Flow, Farruko, J Alvarez) Prod. By Kastro (2011)
 Pata Boom (Remix) (Jory feat. Daddy Yankee, Alexis & Fido, Jowell y Randy) (2011)
 Aprovecha (feat. Daddy Yankee) (2011)
 No Se (2011)
 Bien Comodo (feat. Daddy Yankee, Randy, J Alvarez, Guelo Star, Arcángel, Baby Rasta & Gringo, Yaga & Mackie) (2011)
 La Curiosidad Me Mata (Nova feat. J Albert) (2011)
 Me Tumba El Fronte (Nova feat. El Negro Mou) (2011)
 Noche De Nuvo (Nova feat. Majadero) (2011)
 Fugemonos Esta Noche (Nova feat. Joniel) (2011)
 Loco Por Tu Amor (Jory feat. Siniestro) (2011)
 Seguimos Receptivos (Jory feat. Sou Y Oa) (2011)
 Un Saludo A Las Nenas (feat. Mozart La Para) (2011)
 Alejate De Mi (Remix) (Jory feat. Trebol Clan) (2011)
 Alejate De Mi (Remix to the Remix) (Jory feat. Jessikita) (2011)
 Plastica (Jory feat. Kervin "El Increible") (2011)
 Salieron A Cazar (Nova feat. JP "El Sinico") (2011)
 Pierden Los Modales (Jory feat. JP "El Sinico") (2011)
 Plastica (Jory feat. Farruko, J Alvarez) (2011)
 Presten Atencion (Jory feat. Carlitos Rossy) (2011)
 Solo Pasajero (Jory feat. Lui-G 21+) (2011)
 Diri Diri (Jory feat. Ñengo Flow) (2011)
 Naki (2011)
 Mi Atencion Atrapa (Nova) (2012)
 Tiempo Pasado, Tiempo Perdido (Jory) (2012)
 Tu Novio No La Hace (2012)
 Si Supieras (Jory feat. Jowell) (2012)
 Sustancia ( Jory feat. Ñejo & Dalmata)
 Mi chiquita remix (Nova feat. Fade, Juno "The Hitmaker", Galante"El emperador", Jadiel"El incomparable")
 Dejame Saber (Jory feat. Gotay "El Autentiko" & Nengo Flow) (2012)
 Una Noche Inolvidable (Jory) (2012)
 Una Aventura (Jory feat. Gotay "El Autentiko") (2012)
 More (Jory feat. Zion & Ken-Y) (2012)
 Ya Nada Es Asi (Jory feat. Gotay "El Autentiko") (2012)
 Mi Gatita Es Calle (Nova) (2012)
 Que Casualidad (Jory) (2012)
 Modelo De Revista (Jory) (2012)
 Romeo & Julieta (Jory) (2013)
 No Le Digas A Nadie (Nova feat. Gotay) (2013)
 Solo En Sueños (Nova) (2013)
 De Ti Depende (Jory feat. Plan B) (2013)
 Negarlo Todo (Maluma feat. Jory) (2013)
 Sigo Esperandote (Jory) (2013)
 Sistema (Wisin feat. Jory) (2013)
 Once Again (Jory feat. Lui-G 21 Plus) (Imperio Nazza 3) (2013)
 Lo Que Ofrezco de Gratis (Nova feat. Lui-G 21 Plus) (2013)
 Matando la liga (Jory feat. R2)
 La Pasión Me Llama (Nova feat. RKM) (2013)
 Ponle Dj (Nova feat. Farruko) (2013)
 Me Niegas (Remix) (Jory feat. Baby Rasta & Gringo & Ñengo Flow) (2013)
 Inevitable (Jory feat. La Jota) (2013)
 Lo Hacemos En Secreto (Remix) (Jory feat. Mr.Frank & Gabyson)
 Dime Baby (Jory) (2013)
 Otra Vez (Nova) (2013)
 Detras De Ti (Farruko feat. Jory) (2014)
 Claro (Wisin feat. Jory) (2014)
 No Te Illusiones (Jory Boy feat. Carlito Rossy) (2014)

Discography: Jory Boy

Extended Releases
Jory

Singles
"More" (ft. Zion & Ken-Y) (2012)
"Romeo y Julieta" (2013)
"Noches de Fantasía" (2014)
"Un Pirata" (June 15, 2014)
"Mucho Dembow" (June 15, 2014)
"No Me Llamas, No Te Llamo" (July 4, 2014)
"Noches De Fantasía" (ft, Farruko & J Alvarez) (October 18, 2014)
"Quédate Conmigo" (2014)
"Por Que Cambiar” (ft. Plan B) (August 28, 2018)
"Bonita" (2015)
"Por Qué Cambiar" (Solo Version) (2015)
"Volvió La Peste" (November 27, 2015)
"Imposible Amor" (Salsa Version) (May 20, 2016)
"Detras De Ti" (May 27, 2016)
”Cuentos de Cama” (ft. Alexio “La Bestia”) (September 2, 2016)
"Detrás De Ti" (ft. Ozuna)(Official Remix) (September 30, 2016)
"No Te Hagas" (w/Bad Bunny) (March 11, 2017)
"Desafio" (ft. Maluma) (August 4, 2017)
"Nada Serio" (w/Almighty) (October 5, 2017)
"No Me Busques" (February 16, 2018)
"Ying Yang" (ft. J Alvarez) (April 27, 2018)

Discography: Nova

References

External links
Nova & Jory Official MySpace
Jory Boy Facebook
Nova La Amenaza Facebook
Official Jory Boy Twitter

Reggaeton duos
People from Carolina, Puerto Rico
Puerto Rican rappers
Puerto Rican reggaeton musicians
Puerto Rican musical duos
Living people
Singers from Ponce
Musical groups established in 2003
21st-century American rappers
Year of birth missing (living people)